Euphorbia cap-saintemariensis is a species of plant in the family Euphorbiaceae. It is endemic to Madagascar.  Its natural habitat is rocky areas. It is threatened by habitat loss.

References

Endemic flora of Madagascar
cap-saintemariensis
Critically endangered plants
Taxonomy articles created by Polbot